Metroline is a bus company operating services in Greater London and south Hertfordshire. It is a subsidiary of ComfortDelGro Corporation of Singapore, It also operates bus services under contract to Transport for London. As at March 2021, the fleet consisted of 1,532 buses, making it the third largest London Buses operator. Operations are split between two registered companies, Metroline Travel Limited and Metroline West Limited.

Company history

On 1 April 1989, London Buses was divided into 11 separate business units, one of which was Metroline. As part of the privatisation of London bus services, Metroline was sold in October 1994 to a management buyout worth £20 million. In July 1998, it purchased MTL London and in March 2000 was sold to ComfortDelGro. In August 2004 ComfortDelGro purchased Thorpes and in November 2004 Armchair Passenger Transport with seven routes and 86 buses. The coach business of Armchair was absorbed into ComfortDelGro-owned Westbus UK in 2006. Thorpes and Armchair initially retained their existing names before being rebranded to Metroline in January 2007. 

When privatised, Metroline adopted a livery of red with a dark blue skirt. This was briefly changed to light blue in the mid 2000s before the dark blue was reinstated. In June 2009, Metroline adopted an all red scheme to comply with Transport for London requirements. In 2014, a blue, white and red livery was introduced on buses dedicated to non-Transport for London services.

On 22 June 2013, Metroline purchased First London's Alperton, Greenford, Hayes, Uxbridge and Willesden Junction depots with 494 buses.

On 10 September 2021, Alperton depot closed to make way for redevelopment, with a Farewell Open Day being held the following day.

A major fire broke out at Potters Bar garage on 22 May 2022, destroying six buses but resulting in no injuries. Drivers were able to move the majority of the garage's buses away from the fire. Two of the buses destroyed were Optare MetroDecker EVs, also in service with Go-Ahead London and Tower Transit, causing a nationwide recall of the type.

See also
List of bus operators of the United Kingdom

References

External links 

 

ComfortDelGro companies
London bus operators
Transport companies established in 1989
1989 establishments in England